In Scouting, a jamboree is a large gathering of Scouts and/or Girl Guides who rally at a national or international level.

History
The 1st World Scout Jamboree was held in 1920, and was hosted by the United Kingdom. Since then, there have been twenty-three other World Scout Jamborees, hosted in various countries, generally every four years. The 25th World Jamboree is to be held in Korea in 2023.

There are also national and continental jamborees held around the world with varying frequency. Many of these events will invite and attract Scouts from overseas.

Other gatherings
With the birth of the Jamboree concept, other large gatherings are also organized by national Scout organizations, geared towards a particular group of Scouts. Examples of these large gatherings include:
 Moot - a camp or a gathering of Rovers
 Venture - a gathering of young people in the Venture (Senior Scout) section
 Indaba - a camp or a gathering of Adult Scout leaders
 Agoonoree - a camp of Scouts with special needs
 COMDECA - acronym for Community Development Camp, a large gathering of young people, implementing community development projects

Etymology
The origin of the word jamboree is not well understood. This is reflected in many dictionary entries. For example, according to the Canadian Oxford Dictionary, the etymology is "19th century, origin unknown". The Oxford English Dictionary (OED) identifies it as coming from American slang, identifying a use in the New York Herald in 1868 and in Irish writing later in the 19th century.

It is popularly believed within the Scouting Movement that the word was coined by Baden-Powell, but there is no written documentation by either Powell or Scouting publications, and the word was in use decades earlier.

Use prior to Scouting
Baden-Powell was once asked why he chose "jamboree". He replied, "What else would you call it?" Other than a light-hearted retort, one way his response could have made sense is if the word had already had a specific meaning.

Other writers used "jamboree" in the early 20th century, prior to its use in Scouting, to refer to "a lavish or boisterous celebration or party". Poet Robert W. Service used the term in a poem, Athabaska Dick, published in 1912: "They are all a-glee for the jamboree, and they make the Landing ring". Lucy Maud Montgomery used the term three times in 1915 in Anne of the Island, a book set in the 1880s. For example "There was quite a bewildering succession of drives, dances, picnics and boating parties, all expressively lumped together by Phil under the head of “jamborees”.

Robert Graves suggested in 1954 that Baden-Powell might have known the word through his regiment's Irish links, rather than from U.S. slang.

Other theories
The word "jamboree" has several claimed possible origins, ranging from Hindi to Swahili to Native American languages, which further confuses the meaning used by Baden-Powell.

A guess is that the word "jamboree" is derived from the Swahili for hello, Jambo!. Baden-Powell spent a considerable amount of time in West Africa in the 1880s then again in the late 1890s.

Use in Scouting
The word "jamboree" is used primarily by the Scouting program following the first Boy Scout jamboree in 1920. Baden-Powell deliberately chose the name "jamboree" where attendees were warmly welcomed attending this first Boy Scout rally or meeting with the word "jambo."

The word jamboree in English is used as a borrowed foreign word, with the ending -ree. The word jamboree is both a noun and a transitive verb, with a direct action of the root word jambo. For example, an attendee of a jambo is a jamboree.

Many, at this first "jamboree" or Scout gathering, did not fully capture the spirit of this then-new concept or greeting. At the first World Jamboree at Olympia, London, in 1920, Baden-Powell said:"People give different meanings for this word, but from this year on, jamboree will take a specific meaning. It will be associated to the largest gathering of youth that ever took place."

Olave Baden-Powell coined the term  to refer to the lingua franca used between Scouts of different languages and cultural habits, that develops when diverse Scouts meet, that fosters friendship and understanding between Scouts of the world. Sometimes the word "jamborette" is used to denote smaller, either local or international, gatherings.

A similarly-used word, "camporee," in the Scouting program is also reflective of the older British use. "Camporee" reflects a local or regional gathering of Scouting units for a period of camping and common activities. Similar to a camporee, a jamboree occurs less often and draws units from the entire nation or world.

International jamborees
 World Scout Jamboree, a gathering of Scouts from all over the world under the World Organization of the Scout Movement. Attendance is 30–40,000.
 World Scout Jamboree on the Air (JOTA) - an amateur radio event linking Scouts across the world
 World Scout Jamboree on the Internet (JOTI)
 Jamboree on the Trail (JOTT) is an international day of hiking
 Africa Scout Jamboree
 Arab Scout Jamboree
 Asia-Pacific Scout Jamboree
 Caribbean Scout Jamboree, a gathering of Scouts from the Caribbean
 Central European Jamboree, a gathering of Scouts from Central Europe
 European Scout Jamboree, a gathering of Scouts from all over Europe
 Interamerican Scout Jamboree, a gathering of Scouts from the Interamerican Scout Region
 Essex International Jamboree, a gathering of 7,000-9,000 Scouts and Guides from all over the world, held since 1927
 World Federation of Independent Scouts World Jamboree, a gathering of Scouts of the World Federation of Independent Scouts
 Jamboree 2008 (Northumberland), a celebration of the 1908 Humshaugh camp
 Homenetmen General Jamboree, a gathering of Scouts of the Homenetmen
 ISIS Muon Jamboree
 International Cultural Jamboree

National jamborees
 National Scout jamboree, Boy Scouts of America
 Canadian Scout Jamboree, a gathering of Scouts from Canada
 Australian Scout Jamboree, a gathering of Scouts from Australia and the Asia-Pacific Region
 Australian Girl Guide Jamboree, a gathering of Girl Guides from around Australia and the world.
 Nippon Jamboree, a gathering of Scouts from Japan
 Nawaka, a gathering of Sea Scouts in the Netherlands
 Irish Scout Jamborees
 New Zealand Scout Jamboree
 Girl Scout Senior Roundup

See also

 Agoonoree
 Camporee
 Indaba
 World Camp (Guiding)

References

External links

 
 
 
 
 
 
 
 

 
Scouting events